Herman op den Graeff (Aldekerk, 26 November 1585 - Krefeld, 27 December 1642) was a Mennonite community leader from Krefeld.

Origin

Herman Op den Graeff was the first historically proven member of the Op den Graeff family. He was born on 26 November 1585 in Aldekerk, Germany. Some believe that Duke John William, Duke of Jülich-Cleves-Berg had a morganatic marriage prior to 1585 with Anna op den Graeff (van de Aldekerk), with whom he had a son, Herman op den Graeff. No substantial evidence of any relation between the Op den Graeff and John William, Duke of Jülich-Cleves-Berg has ever been presented, so most likely that connection is non-existent.

Life

Herman op den Graeff was a wealthy linen weaver and merchant. In 1605, he removed to Kempen where he met and married Greitgen Pletjes (or Greitje Pletjes) on 6 August 1605.

Krefeld Mennonite Church 
In Krefeld, Op den Graeff became a leader of the Mennonite community, and in 1632, was one of two Krefeld Mennonite Church delegates to sign the Dordrecht Confession of Faith. In 1637, he was named as the "der hiesigen Mennoniten Herr Bischof" of Krefeld.

Descendants
Some of Herman op den Graeff's descendants migrated to the United States. They are among the thirteen families often referred to as the Germantown, Philadelphia, Pennsylvania Founders, who arrived on the ship Concord on 6 October 1683. Among these families were three op den Graeff brothers, including grandson Abraham op den Graeff, a cousin of William Penn, the founder of Pennsylvania.

Pennsylvania Governor Samuel Whitaker Pennypacker was Herman's sixth-great-grandson.

References

Further reading
 Bender, Harold S. (1957) Graeff, op den (Opdegraf, Updegrave, Updegrove Uptegrove) family. Global Anabaptist Mennonite Encyclopedia Online. Global Anabaptist Mennonite Encyclopedia Online
 Ulle, R.F. (1983) The Original Germantown Families. Mennonite Family History April.

Mennonite ministers
People from Krefeld
People from the Rhine Province
1585 births
1642 deaths